The 1962 South American Basketball Championship for Women was the 9th regional tournament for women in South America. It was held in Asunción, Paraguay and won by the local squad. Seven teams competed.

Results
To define the final standings, each team played the other teams once in a round robin.

External links
 FIBA Archive

South
1962
Sports competitions in Asunción
South American Basketball Championship for Women
1962 in Paraguayan sport
1960s in Asunción
April 1962 sports events in South America
May 1962 sports events in South America